Infanta Maria da Assunção of Braganza; Queluz, 25 June 1805 – Santarém, 7 January 1834) was a Portuguese infanta (princess) daughter of King John VI of Portugal and his wife Carlota Joaquina of Borbón.

She died unmarried when she was just 28 years old. She was first buried at the Miracle Church in Santarém but then moved to the Royal Pantheon of the Braganza Dynasty, in Lisbon.

Ancestry

References 

1805 births
1834 deaths
Portuguese infantas
House of Braganza
19th-century Portuguese people
19th-century Portuguese women
Dames of the Order of Saint Isabel
Burials at the Monastery of São Vicente de Fora
Royal reburials
Daughters of kings